Color or colour is the visual perceptual property corresponding in humans to the categories called red, yellow, blue, green, etc.

Color or colour may also refer to:

Science
 Color charge, in particle physics, a property of quarks and gluons
 Color index, in astronomy, a simple numerical expression that determines the color of an object
 Color temperature, the temperature of a radiating black body corresponding to a given color of light
 Color vision, the ability of an organism or machine to distinguish objects based on light wavelength
 Colorimetry, the mathematical science of the measurement and perception of color
 Colors of noise, the descriptions of noises based on the shape of their spectral densities
 Dye, a colored substance that has an affinity to the substrate to which it is being applied
 Food coloring, any substance added to food to change its color
 Pigment, solid colored particles, used in paints
 Biological pigment, colored substances in living organisms
 Primary color, a color belonging to a set of three that can be combined to make a gamut of colors

Arts, entertainment, and media

Films
 Colors (film), a 1988 film starring Sean Penn and Robert Duvall
 Colours (film), a 2009 Indian Malayalam film

Games
 Colors (video game), a cancelled video game for the Gizmondo GPS console
 Colours (solitaire), a card game
 Colors!, a Nintendo DS homebrew program
 Sonic Colors, a 2010 video game for the Wii

Literature
 The Colour, a 2003 novel by Rose Tremain

Music

Groups
 Color (band), a Japanese punk band
 Colour, a defunct British math pop band formerly signed to Big Scary Monsters Recording Company
 The Colour, a defunct American band whose guitarist now fronts the band The Romany Rye
The Color (band), Canadian Christian music group

Albums

Color(s)
 Color (album), a 2008 album by NEWS
 Color (EP), a 2022 EP by Kwon Eun-bi
 Colors (Beck album), 2017
 Colors (Between the Buried and Me album), 2007
 Colors (CNBLUE album), 2015
 Colors (Laleh album), 2013
 Colors (Ken Nordine album), 1966
 Colors (House of Heroes album), 2016
 Colors (EP), a 2015 EP by Miss A
 Colors (Rina Aiuchi album), 2010
 Colors, a 1990 album by Mari Hamada
 Colors, a 1974 album by Raul de Souza
 Color, a 2010 EP by Girugamesh
The Color (album), a 2011 album by Yellowbirds

Colour(s)
 Colour (Andy Hunter album), 2008
 Colour (The Christians album), 1990
 Colours (Adam F album), 1997
 Colours (Ayumi Hamasaki album), 2014
 Colours (Baccara album), 1979
 Colours (Christopher album), 2012
 Colours (1972 Donovan album)
 Colours (1987 Donovan album)
 Colours (1991 Donovan album)
 Colours (Eloy album), 1980
 Colours (Graffiti6 album), 2010
 Colours (Mark Norman album), 2007
 Colours (Michael Learns to Rock album), 1993
 Colours (Nadia Oh album), 2011
 Colours (Resurrection Band album), 1980
 Colours (Stone album), 1990
 Colours (EP), a 2014 EP by PartyNextDoor
 Colours, a 1999 album by The Ten Tenors
 Colours, a 2019 EP by Pixey

Songs

Color(s)
 "Colors" (Broiler song), 2013
 "Colors" (Flow song), 2006
 "Colors" (Halsey song), 2016
 "Colors" (Hikaru Utada song), 2003
 "Colors" (Ice-T song), 1988
 "Colors" (Jason Derulo song), 2018
 "Colors" (Morandi song), 2009
 "Color", a 2010 song by The Maine from Black & White
 "Color", a 2016 song by Todrick Hall from Straight Outta Oz
 "Color", a 2017 song by Carly Pearce from Every Little Thing
 "Colors", a 1990 song by Iced Earth from Iced Earth
 "Colors", a 2004 song by Crossfade from Crossfade
 "Colors", a 2007 song by The Rocket Summer from Do You Feel
 "Colors (Into Nothing)", a 2012 song by Code Orange from Love Is Love/Return to Dust
 "Colors", a 2015 song by Hardwell from United We Are
 "Colors", a 2016 song by Eric Saade from Saade
 "Colors", a 2017 song by Beck from Colors
 "Colors", a 2017 song by Day6 from Moonrise (Day6 album)
 "Colors", a 2019 song by Loona from X X
 "Colors", a 2021 song by Lauren Jauregui
 "Colors", a 2019 song by Black Pumas from Black Pumas

Colour(s)
 "Colours" (Donovan song), 1965
 "Colours" (Grouplove song), 2011
 "Colour", a 1998 song by Seal from Human Being
 "Colours", a 2013 song by Age of Consent from The Music of Grand Theft Auto V
 "Colours", a 2007 song by Calvin Harris from I Created Disco
 "Colours", a 2006 song by Hot Chip from The Warning
 "Colours", a 1989 song by Phil Collins from ...But Seriously
 "Colours", a 2012 song by The Chevin from Borderland
 "Colours", a 2009 song by The Prodigy from Invaders Must Die
 "Colours", a 1989 song by The Sisters of Mercy from Floodland
 "Colours", a 2019 song by Keiino
 "Colours", a 2019 song by Pixey

Other uses in music
 Tone color, or timbre
 Color, in medieval music theory, a sequence of repeated notes in the cantus firmus tenor of a composition, in isorhythm
 Coloration, in medieval music theory, a technique of marking notes, in mensural notation

Television
 Colors TV, an Indian television channel
 Colours (TV channel), a Philippine satellite television channel
 "Color", an episode of the Adult Swim television series Off the Air
 Colors (TV series), and Indian television show, see Reema Debnath

Visual art
 Color analysis (art), a process of determining the colors that best suit an individual's natural coloring
 Color code, a system for displaying information by using different colors
 Color photography
 Color theory, the art of color mixing and the visual impact of color combinations
 Color wheel or color circle, a logical arrangement of colors around a circle for artistic or scientific purposes
 Color, in typography, the overall density and balance between white space and print in a page layout

Other uses in arts, entertainment, and media
 Color (manga), a 1999 Japanese manga
 Color commentary, or color, in a sporting event broadcast, supplemental information offered between play-by-play calls
 Colors (magazine), a multilingual quarterly magazine
COLORS, or ColorsxStudios, a German live performance media company and YouTube channel

Computing and technology
 Color (software), a color-grading application for Apple's Final Cut Studio video production suite
 Color Labs, a former social photo and video broadcasting smartphone application, also known as color.com

Finance and law
 Color of law, a legal term meaning "pretense or appearance of" some right
 Color, also known as gamma decay, the derivative of gamma with respect to time

Insignia and groups
 Colors (motorcycling), motorcycling club insignia
 Military colours, flags of a regiment, battalion, etc.
 Gang colors, colors or insignia worn by gang members
 Political colour, colors associated with a political party or ideology
 Sporting colours, a form of recognition for sporting prowess at a university; known in many places as a Blue
 Color Genomics, a population health company that provides genetic tests
 Colors (symbolic), representative of institutions, for example as at List of Oklahoma state symbols

Skin color, ethnicity, or race
 Colored, a potentially offensive term used in the U.S. to refer to people of certain ethnicities
 Coloureds, a term in Southern Africa for people of mixed ethnic origin
 Human skin color, human skin pigmentation
 Person of color, a term used primarily in the U.S. for a person who is not white
 Race (human categorization), as defined when conflated with skin color

Other
 Colors (restaurant), a restaurant in New York City

See also
 
 
 The Color (disambiguation)
 Animal coloration
 Colorful (disambiguation)
 Coloring (disambiguation)
 In Color (disambiguation)
 Coulours, a commune in the Yonne department in Bourgogne-Franche-Comté in north-central France
 List of colors